Madeleine Redfern (born 1967) is a Canadian Inuit politician, who was elected mayor of Iqaluit, Nunavut in a by-election on December 13, 2010. She was the city's mayor until 2019.

She was born in Iqaluit (then called Frobisher Bay, Northwest Territories). Redfern graduated from the Akitsiraq Law School before becoming the first Inuk to be offered a clerkship at the Supreme Court of Canada. She was selected by outgoing Justice Louise Arbour to clerk under her replacement, Justice Louise Charron.

Redfern is a businessperson, consultant and social advocate in Iqaluit, and was most recently the executive director of the Qikiqtani Truth Commission, looking into the legacy of historical effects of federal government policies on Eastern Arctic Inuit during the period from the 1950s through the 1980s. She ran as a candidate for the Legislative Assembly of Nunavut in the 2008 territorial election in Iqaluit Centre, but lost to incumbent MLA Hunter Tootoo.

She is an outspoken critic of Nunavut's government. "We live in a chilly banana republic," she said of the territorial government, a short time before becoming mayor.

On July 24, 2012, Redfern announced at a meeting of the Iqaluit City Council that she would not run for re-election in the next election. She was succeeded in that fall's municipal election by John Graham, but Graham resigned two years into his term and was succeeded by Mary Wilman. In the 2015 election, Redfern ran for mayor again, defeating Wilman.

Electoral record

References

1967 births
Mayors of Iqaluit
Inuit politicians
Women mayors of places in Nunavut
Canadian Inuit women
Living people
Indspire Awards
21st-century Canadian politicians
21st-century Canadian women politicians
Inuit from the Northwest Territories
Inuit from Nunavut